The Federal Competition and Consumer Protection Commission (FCCPC) is the highest federal competition regulator in Nigeria. The FCCPC operates within the Federal Ministry of Trade and Investment and is responsible for protecting market competition and promoting consumer protection.

History 
In 2019, President Muhammadu Buhari signed into law the Federal Competition and Consumer Protection Act, thereby creating the agency. The agency's purpose is to develop and promote fair, efficient and competitive markets in the Nigerian economy and to also facilitate access by all citizens to safe products and secure the protection of rights for all consumers in Nigeria.

In 2020, the FCCPC signed a "memorandum of understanding" with the U.S. Federal Trade Commission (FTC), pledging international cooperation in the realm of consumer protection efforts.

Activities 
Given the significance of the petroleum industry in Nigeria, one of the primary tasks of the FCCPC has been to rein in anti-competitive conduct in the natural gas market. In the realm of consumer protection, the FCCPC has intervened in the healthcare sector to protect the rights of patients.

Leadership 
The agency is led by Babatunde Irukera, who serves as the FCCPC's chief executive officer.

References

See also

Regulation in Nigeria
Government agencies of Nigeria
Government agencies established in 1992
Government of Nigeria
Consumer rights agencies
Competition regulators